The Hastings High School is a historic public high school building in the St. Johns County School District. It is located at 6195 South Main Street in Hastings, Florida, in southwest St. Johns County, Florida. The building no longer operates as a school, and currently serves as a library.

History
Construction of a new school, designed by Fred A. Henderich, began in May 1924. The two-story coquina building had a roof of Spanish tile and included 12 classrooms, laboratories, administrative offices, a cafeteria and an auditorium with seating for 650. Lighting was electric and heat was provided with hot water radiators.

The Hastings Branch of the St. Johns County Public Library is located in this building.

On June 14, 2006, it was added to the U.S. National Register of Historic Places.

Notable alumni
 Derrick Ramsey (born 1956), Kentucky Secretary of Education and Workforce Development and former NFL player who played tight end for nine seasons for the Oakland/Los Angeles Raiders, New England Patriots and Detroit Lions.

References

External links

St. Johns County School District website
Weekly List Of Actions Taken On Properties: 6/12/06 through 6/16/06 at National Register of Historic Places

High schools in St. Johns County, Florida
National Register of Historic Places in St. Johns County, Florida
Educational institutions established in 1924
Public high schools in Florida
1924 establishments in Florida